The Good Cider Guide was a book published occasionally by the Campaign for Real Ale (CAMRA) listing cider and perry outlets and producers in the United Kingdom. It is the cider equivalent to their annual Good Beer Guide.

Details
The intention of the book is to be a "guide for real cider-loving connoisseurs". The most recent edition, published in 2005, contains details of over 550 cider outlets (pubs, clubs and off licences), and claims to include every producer in the UK. Producers and outlets are listed separately by county with maps and full directions, and there are also articles about cider and perry history, cider and perry making, and cider abroad.

As a CAMRA publication, the emphasis is on producers and outlets that produce "real cider", as defined by CAMRA.

The book has been published by CAMRA since 1996.

Editions
The guide is published every few years:

References

Cider
Books about food and drink
British books
British cuisine